St. James is a hamlet and census-designated place (CDP) in Suffolk County, New York, United States. The population of the CDP was 13,487 at the 2020 census. St. James is part of the Town of Smithtown and is located on the North Shore of Long Island. The ZIP code is 11780.

History
In the early 20th century, St. James was a popular vacation spot for glitterati of the stage and screen. Summer residents included Lionel, Ethel, and John Barrymore, Buster Keaton, Myrna Loy, and Irving Berlin, among others. Noteworthy persons of the hamlet have included Stanford White, architect; William Jay Gaynor, New York State Supreme Court Justice and Mayor of New York City; Mick Foley, professional wrestler; Soledad O'Brien, television personality; John Miceli, drummer for Meat Loaf; and John Petrucci, lead guitar player for Dream Theater.

The St. James General Store, located on Moriches Road, is said to be the oldest continuously operating general store in the United States. It and a number of other historic structures were added to the National Register of Historic Places in 1973 as part of the Saint James District.

Many of these 19th-century structures are located along New York State Route 25A, otherwise known as North Country Road. Among them is Saint James Episcopal Church, the source of the hamlet's name during the 1850s. In 1873, St. James Rail Road Station was established. Although small, the historic station-house is the second-oldest on the Long Island Rail Road.

Geography
St. James is located at  (40.877202, -73.155260).

To the north of the hamlet lies the Village of Head of the Harbor and Stony Brook Harbor.

St. James is situated in the eastern part of the town of Smithtown, east of the hamlet of Smithtown. Immediately due east of St. James sits the main campus of Stony Brook University, a major public research university.

It is approximately 15 minutes from Port Jefferson. This allows for quick access to the Bridgeport & Port Jefferson Ferry, which offers transportation across the Long Island Sound to New England while avoiding New York City traffic.

Demographics

As of the census of 2000, there were 13,268 people, 4,555 households, and 3,466 families residing in the CDP. The population density was 2,924.6 per square mile (1,128.4/km2). There were 4,674 housing units at an average density of 1,030.3/sq mi (397.5/km2). The racial makeup of the CDP was 97.36% White, 0.27% African American, 0.05% Native American, 1.24% Asian, 0.01% Pacific Islander, 0.55% from other races, and 0.52% from two or more races. Hispanic or Latino of any race were 3.45% of the population.

There were 4,555 households, out of which 36.6% had children under the age of 18 living with them, 66.5% were married couples living together, 7.2% had a female householder with no husband present, and 23.9% were non-families. 20.6% of all households were made up of individuals, and 13.3% had someone living alone who was 65 years of age or older. The average household size was 2.81 and the average family size was 3.27.

In the CDP, the population was spread out, with 25.9% under the age of 18, 5.0% from 18 to 24, 29.8% from 25 to 44, 21.2% from 45 to 64, and 18.1% who were 65 years of age or older. The median age was 39 years. For every 100 females, there were 88.4 males. For every 100 females age 18 and over, there were 82.6 males.

The median income for a household in the CDP was $71,144, and the median income for a family was $82,291. Males had a median income of $59,018 versus $38,103 for females. The per capita income for the CDP was $29,643. About 1.6% of families and 2.6% of the population were below the poverty line, including 1.8% of those under age 18 and 2.2% of those age 65 or over.

References

External links

 St. James General Store at Suffolk County, New York Parks website

Smithtown, New York
Census-designated places in New York (state)
Census-designated places in Suffolk County, New York
Hamlets in New York (state)